James Adair Crawford was a civil servant of the British Empire, in 1893 he served as the Chief political resident of the Persian Gulf (which included Bahrain, Kuwait, Oman, Qatar, and the Trucial States). Three years later in 1896 he also served as the acting Chief Commissioner of Balochistan, British India.

References

Indian Political Service officers
1857 births
1936 deaths